CER (Serbian: Цифарски Електронски Рачунар / Cifarski Elektronski Računar - Digital Electronic Computer) model 20 was an early digital computer developed by Mihajlo Pupin Institute (Serbia). It was designed as a functioning prototype of an "electronic bookkeeping machine". The first prototype was planned for 1964.

References

See also
 CER Computers
 Mihajlo Pupin Institute
 History of computer hardware in the SFRY

CER-020
CER computers